Turea is a surname of Eastern European origin. Notable people with the surname include:

 Adriana Turea (born 1975), Romanian luger
 Andrei Turea (born 1998), Romanian luger

Romanian-language surnames